Resistance to inhibitors of cholinesterase-8A (Ric-8A), also known as Synembryn-A, is a protein that in humans is encoded by the RIC8A gene.

Interactions
RIC8A has been shown to interact with GNAO1, GNA13, GNAQ, GNAS complex locus, GNAI2, GNAI1 and GNAI3.

References

Further reading